The Manipal Institute of Technology is a constituent engineering school of the private Manipal Academy of Higher Education in Manipal, Karnataka, India.

The institute contains 17 academic departments and awards undergraduate, graduate and post graduate degrees. Established in 1957, it is one of the first self-financed colleges in India. The Manipal Academy of Higher Education campus is spread over 313 acres of what once used to be a desolate plateau of hard, laterite rock in south Karnataka's Udupi district.

History

Foundation and early years (1957–1960)
Manipal Engineering College (MEC) was inaugurated on 11 May 1957 by the then Chief Minister of Mysore, S. Nijalingappa. The first President of the college was Roque Fernandes. In the initial months, lectures were held at the Kasturba Medical College, Manipal campus before the infrastructure was ready at its present campus towards the end of 1957.

Growth and expansion (1961–1999)
Civil engineering was the first discipline to be offered at the institute, but by 1961, full undergraduate programs were also available in the areas of mechanical engineering and electrical engineering. Housing facilities were operational from 1961 for outstation students.

In initial years institute was affiliated to the Karnatak University. In 1965, the institute got affiliated to the University of Mysore. More courses were added over the decades as the college expanded. The MIT, Manipal Student Chapter of the Institution of Engineers (Mechanical and Manufacturing Engineering) was established in the mid-1960s.

In 1969, Chemical Engineering was introduced as a branch of study followed by Electronics and Communication engineering. In 1973, the semester scheme was adopted and a one-year postgraduate diploma in industrial engineering was offered. In the same year, the Venugopala Temple, modelled on the famous Kirti Mandir, Vadodara, Gujarat was built.

The MIT campus has been visited by several well-known persons at various times in its history. The Tibetan spiritual leader the Dalai Lama visited the college in 1966. The 1970s saw the visit of Smt Indira Gandhi, the then Prime Minister of India.

In 1974, it was renamed as Manipal Institute of Technology. The institute was brought under the purview of Mangalore University in 1980. In 1979, other branches of study such as Industrial Production and Architecture were introduced. The swimming pool was inaugurated in 1986, the floodlit basketball court at Kamath Circle in 1989.

In 1993 Manipal Academy of Higher Education (MAHE) was granted deemed university status and Manipal Institute of Technology became its constituent college.

The new millennium (2000–2015)
Dr. A. P. J. Abdul Kalam, the then President of India, visited the college and interacted with the students in 2003. This visit was later repeated in 2010 by the then President of India Pratibha Patil.

The dawn of the new millennium brought in the construction of new buildings. 2006 saw the construction of the Innovation Center, housing companies such as Phillips and EMC2 and associated research and development. The 7-floor 13th Block located between the 3rd and 4th blocks for housing lady students was also completed during this period. The adjoining New Lecture Hall complex ('NLH') was built anticipating the increase in intake and was inaugurated in the year 2006. 2007 saw the inauguration of Academic Block 5, the largest academic building on campus, housing classrooms, academic and research labs, and department and faculty offices.

Undergraduate courses in Instrumentation and Control Engineering were added in 2001 and Mechatronics was added in 2006 and those in Aeronautical Engineering and Automobile Engineering were added in 2008. The department of Architecture was rechristened as The Faculty of Architecture in 2006, and then as Manipal School of Architecture and Planning and Design, as a separate institute under the Manipal Academy of Higher Education in 2011. In 2013, an integrated course in Computer Science and Communication Engineering was added, under the department of Information and Communication Technology. The annual undergraduate student intake increased from 800 spread over 12 engineering disciplines in the year 2003 to 1,500 spread over 16 disciplines in 2008. , the institute has an intake of more than 2,300 students.

The institute was also visited by Smt. Pratibha Patil, the then President of India for the university's annual convocation in December 2010. The then Finance Minister and future President of India, Shri Pranab Mukherjee also visited the institute on 26 May 2012 to inaugurate one of the Academic Blocks. The institute was visited by acclaimed South Indian film director S.S. Rajmouli in October 2017. The institute also played host to the 49th annual convention of the National Association of Students of Architecture (NASA) in January 2007.

Recent history, new logo and major campus expansion (2016–present)
The new logo of the institute was unveiled by alumni Nokia Former CEO Rajiv Suri during the institute's 2016 convocation. It was designed by Kartikeya Rastogi, who was then a senior year Chemical Engineering undergraduate student.

Numerous new computer oriented branches are being introduced, since most of the students admitted at undergraduate level prefer Computer stream, this trend is on a rise in many Private Institutions in India. (BTech Data Science, B.Tech. Artificial Intelligence & Machine Learning and so on).

In 2016, the college announced a major campus upgrade including the construction of several new buildings:

 The MIT-KEF R&D Center (which will be constructed off-site) for research in Civil Engineering (primarily off-site construction) and Architecture
 A 'student plaza' at KC that will replace several iconic buildings and serve as the new hub for all social activity. It has a beautiful musical fountain at its centre.
 MIT Tech Shop, modelled after Hackerspace that will meet the need for a dedicated space for the ongoing student activities in areas such as robotics, racing (Formula Student), solar and all terrain automobile projects, satellites, UAVs, aeromodelling and rocketry, among others 
 A new food court near the 15th and 16–17th hostel blocks
 A new hostel block (the 22nd) for female students

A major road inside the campus is being converted into a bituminous mini race track by Royal Dutch Shell, which will be cordoned off after college hours to be used by the university's Formula Student racing team and other automobile and aeromodelling/UAV projects.

Campus
MIT Manipal's campus is located 65 km (37 mi) north of Mangalore. The campus is located 3.5 km from Udupi's railway station and is spread over an area of 188 acres (76.0 ha) housing 10 academic buildings, and 22 residential buildings, with a total capacity of 6,080 inhabitants. 

Kamath Circle has been renamed and renovated as Student Plaza with a two-floored Colosseum-like structure and a musical fountain at the center also containing couple of general stores.

The food court, with a seating capacity of 1200 people, caters to the food needs of about 840 people daily. A second food court was constructed in 2018 near the 16th and 17th Hostel Blocks.

Housing
 

Undergraduate students are guaranteed four-year housing in one of MIT's twenty-six hostel buildings. The total housing capacity is 7,258 students, of which 70% is for men and 30% for women. Of this, 95% is occupied by undergraduate students. First year students can choose their rooms on a "first come, first served" basis, while academic performance, seniority and student preference determine the room allotments for subsequent years for undergraduate students. Hostel blocks for first year undergraduate students are different from those blocks that are for senior students.

Academic buildings
The academic area of the campus is segregated from the rest of the campus. There are five academic buildings. Two of them – Academic Block 1 and Academic Block 2 - have been around since the inception of the campus, while the others were built as intake increased. Academic Block 3 is also known as the New Lecture Hall. Academic Block 4, also known as the Innovation Center, has the Manipal University's incubation center, MUTBI (Manipal University Technology Business Incubator). Academic Block 5 is the largest building on campus.

Facilities
The MIT campus is dotted with sports facilities such as the Student Recreational Centre (2 tennis courts, 2 badminton courts and a gym), 2 basketball courts, a cricket/ athletics field, a volleyball court, a football ground, a hockey field, and a swimming pool. In 2019, a boxing ring was inaugurated on campus. Marena Sports Complex is at a walking distance from the campus. There are in-campus gyms in D Block and in the 10th Block. A girls' gym was inaugurated in 2020. The campus also houses several bookstores, stationery shops, restaurants, and a fruit shop. The campus also includes the Venugopal Temple, which was designed by undergraduate architecture students from MSAP (Manipal School of Architecture and Planning), which shares its campus with MIT.

Academics

Academic programs

MIT has been using a credit based system since 2001, in which each course is assigned a number of credits. The odd semester starts around the month of July and ends by December and the even semester starts around January and ends by May. Manipal Academy of Higher Education is accredited by the Government of India's National Assessment and Accreditation Council (NAAC) .

MIT Manipal offers full-time, four/five-year undergraduate (Bachelor's degree) programs in the various disciplines. as well as Master of Technology (M.Tech.) degrees and various other postgraduate programs awarding Master of Science (M.S.) in Software Engineering, Master of Computer Applications (M.C.A.) and an integrated M.B.A. program (in conjunction with other programs in MAHE).

Admissions to postgraduate programs are either on the basis of an entrance exam or the performance in an undergraduate degree program. All applicants are required to have appropriate bachelor's degrees.

The institute also offers Ph.D. programs on a full-time or part-time basis for suitably qualified candidates.

Rankings

Manipal Institute of Technology was ranked 21 among engineering colleges in India by India Today in 2020, 11 among private engineering colleges by Outlook India in 2021 and 45 among engineering colleges by the National Institutional Ranking Framework (NIRF) in 2020.

Admissions
Admission to Manipal Institute of Technology is through the Manipal Entrance Test (MET), that replaced the Manipal University Online Entrance Test (MU OET) for 2019 and beyond, and is carried out at centers across India. It is a computer-based exam and consists of 200 questions testing Physics, Chemistry, Mathematics, English, and logical reasoning and spans a duration of 2 hours and 30 minutes. The test is for 800 marks, +4 for every correct answer and -1 for every wrong one. MAHE offers two opportunities for a student to write the entrance exam, subject to additional payment and availability of vacancies. The format was changed and the test now has 60 questions and the total maximum marks are 240. Each MCQ (Multiple Choice Question) carries 4 marks with negative marking whereas each NAT (Numerical Answer Type) carries 4 marks with no negative marking. Unlike other entrance exams, the computer-based exam scores are displayed immediately after the exam ends, with which one may appear for admission counselling.

Research
The institute makes budgetary provisions for maintenance of research equipment through capital allocation. An amount of ₹15 million was sanctioned to the institute in 2008–09 towards innovation. MITians have access to various journals and educational materials to facilitate research by students. Students of the institute take up summer internship as a part of their curriculum. Several research programs in the areas of nanotechnology, nuclear engineering, VLSI design and pattern recognition are being pursued in the interdisciplinary labs under the institute's innovation center. Manipal Dot Net (MDN) is a privately owned software and hardware design and services organization located close to the campus, that offers internship opportunities to students.

Student life

Student bodies
The oldest student organizations are the editorial board and the Student Council.
The Student Council, MIT Manipal is the apex student body of the institute, composed of elected student representatives of the institute. President chairs the Council followed by the General Secretary.The Cultural Secretary is the overall incharge of all Cultural Clubs of the institute and is also the Convener of Revels, along with the Sports Secretary. Likewise, the Sports Secretary is responsible for all the sporting activities of the Institute and heads as well as coordinates with all the Sports Captains of various Sports Clubs and Teams of the institute. Similarly, Technical Secretary heads all the Technical Clubs and Placement Secretaries coordinate with the companies and students during placement season.
Overall there are close to a hundred clubs and organizations in the institute. The clubs are completely run and managed by the students and they host a variety of events/ competitions throughout the year.  Technical Clubs like SAE-IM (Society of Automotive Engineers- India| Manipal), ASME (American Society of Mechanical Engineers), IE-CSE, IE-Civil, IE-E&C, IE E&E, IE-Mechatronics, Cultural Clubs like- Goonj, the Hindi literary club, Blank-101, Comedy Club Manipal, λΔQ (The Literary, Debate, and Quiz Club), RED-X (The Socio-Adventure Club), and more clubs like Ada Dramatics, Aaina Dramatics and the Music and Fine Arts Club have won several awards at major cultural fests such as Unmaad, IIM Bangalore and Mood Indigo, IIT Bombay.

The college has an official student-run media body, The MIT Post. It was founded on 19 November 2014. The MIT Post keeps a record of all student activities on campus, including those of all other clubs and organizations. Another prominent name is The Photography Club, Manipal which is the official photography club of the college founded all the way back in 1967.

Teams from ManipalTech have won innovation and entrepreneurship competitions such as the GE Edison Innovation Challenge and consecutive victories at the Schneider Electric India Innovation Challenge.

The college has several technical clubs including international as well as national student organizations such as the ACM, IEEE, ISTE, IEMCT and  ASME. These clubs are very active on campus and organize workshops and various other events on a regular basis.

Formula Manipal is a student initiative aiming to conceive, design, fabricate, develop and compete with other Formula style vehicles at International Formula Student events. They built a 600 cc race car that was selected to participate in the Formula SAE 2008 competition organized by the Society of Automotive Engineers held at Ferrari race track at Maranello in Italy, an international race car design competition which is attended by universities from across the world. In 2009, the team participated with the second prototype at FS UK, held at the Silverstone F1 Track.

ThrustMIT is one of the country’s first rocketry teams. The team aims to foster interest and innovation in the field of rocketry. The modus operandi at ThrustMIT involves providing team members hands-on experience in this field, allowing them to improve and learn on the job, which ultimately aids them in supporting the team’s endeavors.

Project Manas is another initiative by students and is an AI robotics team that was founded in the year 2014. They have taken part in India's biggest driverless car challenge - "Spark the Rise" - organized by Mahindra. The team qualified for three stages and is one of the top 13 teams to qualify for the prototyping phase. The prototype is capable of detecting and navigating around pedestrians, a variety of traffic signs and signals, road and non-road regions, vehicles along with a wide range of other obstacles.

AeroMIT is a student project aiming towards aeromodelling and drone research. They design and fabricate RC and autonomous aerial vehicles for competition as well as research purpose. The year 2019-20 was one of the most successful years for the team. They secured podium positions in national competitions like Aerophilia 2019 and Techfest, 2020. The team also secured World Rank 4 in their flagship competition SAE AeroDesign East 2020 held in Lakeland, Florida. Other than that, the team secured World Rank 1 in the category of Oral Presentation by scoring the highest points in the history of the competition and was also the only team to lift the maximum possible payload. Participating in competitions is not the only goal of the team; they also focus on various projects and research work.

Mars Rover Manipal, one of the more recent endeavors by the undergraduate students, is a multi-disciplinary team that designs and builds rovers for exploration of extraterrestrial environments. They regularly compete in various competitions, and have steadily improved their rankings at the University Rover Challenge held by The Mars Society USA, since they first entered in 2016. It is a premier robotics competition held annually every summer at the Mars Desert Research Station in Utah, USA.

Cultural and sports festivals 

MIT hosts one festival every semester. In even semesters, there is a cultural and sports festival, "Revels". The official theme of the 2020 Revels festival was 'Qainaat'. The theme was to drive healthy environmental practices around the globe, to address the environmental crisis. In odd semesters, there is a technical festival, "Tech Tatva". These are student-organized fests, with participants from all over India and overseas. The students of the university, with some help from the administration, carry out the festivities in the campus. The entire process of managing and organizing the fest is handled by the students with the work being divided amongst various categories.

Controversies  
In 2012, following aggressive protests by the students of the Manipal Institute of Technology (MIT), the director, Kum Kum Garg, resigned from her post. The protesting students had demanded the resignation of the director for her alleged insensitive remarks over the death of a student in a bus accident.

In March 2020, MIT required students to download a software called PEXA Lite on their laptops, to conduct proctored end-semester exams. On installing the software, some students complained of their laptops slowing or crashing due to malware.

In February 2021, the students of MIT were called back to campus for the offline end-semester examinations. But on 17 March, offline classes were cancelled due to the rising number of COVID-19 cases in the campus. By the first week of April, over a 1000 students of MIT were infected by the coronavirus due to poor social distancing and lax safety standards in the college.

In the last week of May 2021, MIT released a revised schedule for the upcoming months. This was a very chaotic, tough schedule. This caused outrage amongst the students, who were already not pleased with the college due to unpopular decisions taken by them over the course of the pandemic. The protests by the students of MIT were initially ignored by the administration of MIT and MAHE. But, on 8 June 2021, MIT cancelled the end-semester examinations and opted to prorate the marks based on previous semester performances.

Notable alumni

 Rajeev Chandrasekhar, Indian politician and multimillionaire entrepreneur
 Mirza Faizan, founder and CEO of Avembsys Technologies
 M. G. George Muthoot, billionaire businessman, Former Chairman of Muthoot Finance
 Satya Nadella, chairman and CEO of Microsoft
 Parvati Nair, Indian Model, actress and television presenter
 Pankaj Oswal, billionaire, chairman and sole founder of Burrup Holdings Limited.
 Mahesh Shahdadpuri, founder and CEO of TASC Outsourcing
 Arun Shenoy, Grammy award nominated musician
 Rajeev Suri, CEO of Inmarsat and former CEO of Nokia
 Anant J Talaulicar, president and CEO, Cummins India Ltd

References

External links

 

Manipal Academy of Higher Education schools
Engineering colleges in Karnataka
Educational institutions established in 1957
Academic institutions formerly affiliated with the University of Mysore
1957 establishments in Mysore State